1 for 3 is a Philippine television situational comedy series broadcast by GMA Network. Directed by Bert de Leon, it stars Vic Sotto, Rosanna Roces and Ai-Ai delas Alas. It premiered on April 10, 1997. The series concluded on June 24, 2001. It was replaced by Daddy Di Do Du in its timeslot.

Premise
Gene, a high school teacher who won a lottery ticket to own a house in an exclusive subdivision. He has to share the house he won with two other co-winners in the lottery, Marilen and Susie. Left with no other choice, the reluctant new trio has to live together under one roof and deal with the house's landlady, who thinks that her tenants have a threesome relationship.

Cast and characters

Lead cast
 Vic Sotto as Eugenio aka Gene/Jean
 Rosanna Roces as Susie
 Charlene Gonzales as Marilen
 Ai-Ai delas Alas as Tambulite aka Tam
 Imee Marcos as Cynthia

Supporting cast
 Nanette Inventor as Mrs. Lorenzo
 Joshua Zamora as Miko Lorenzo
 Allan K. as Alexis/Gorgonio "Gorgy" Magalpoc
 Miles Canapi as Bubbles
 Patricia Perez as Val
 Mickey Ferriols as Jamie

Guest cast
 Lorna Tolentino as Yugie
 Joey de Leon as Jake 
 Jimmy Santos as Juanito
 Rico J. Puno as Billy
 Onyok Velasco as Lester
 Berting Labra as Berto

References

External links
 

1997 Philippine television series debuts
2001 Philippine television series endings
Filipino-language television shows
GMA Network original programming
Philippine comedy television series
Philippine television sitcoms
Television series by M-Zet Productions